Azzedine Amanallah (born April 7, 1956) is a retired Moroccan professional football player.

He spent his most of his professional career in France and was also part of the Moroccan squad at the 1986 FIFA World Cup.

External links
Profile

1956 births
Living people
Moroccan footballers
Moroccan expatriate footballers
Morocco international footballers
Botola players
Ligue 1 players
Racing Besançon players
Chamois Niortais F.C. players
En Avant Guingamp players
Expatriate footballers in France
1986 FIFA World Cup players
Sportspeople from Marrakesh
Difaâ Hassani El Jadidi players
Moroccan expatriate sportspeople in France
Association football midfielders